The Mandala of the Two Realms (Traditional Chinese: 両界曼荼羅; Pinyin: Liǎngjiè màntúluó; Rōmaji: Ryōkai mandara), also known as the Mandala of the Two Divisions (Traditional Chinese: 両部曼荼羅; Pinyin: Liǎngbù màntúluó; Rōmaji: Ryōbu mandara), is a set of two mandalas depicting both the Five Wisdom Buddhas of the Diamond Realm as well as the Five Wisdom Kings of the Womb Realm. The number of deities arranged around the cores varies, but may range as high as 414.

The Diamond Realm represents the unchanging cosmic principle of the Buddha, while the Womb Realm depicts the active, physical manifestation of Buddha in the natural world.  The mandalas are thus considered a compact expression of the entirety of the Dharma in Mahayana Buddhism, and form the root of the Vajrayana teachings. Chinese Tangmi and Japanese Shingon and Tendai temples, in particular, often prominently display the Mandalas of the Two Realms mounted at right angles to the image platform on the central altar.

The two mandalas are believed to have evolved separately in India, and were joined for the first time in China, perhaps by Kūkai's teacher Hui-kuo.

See also 
Dharmadhatu

External links 
The Diamond and Womb World Mandalas Dharmapala Thangka Centre
Mandala of the Womb World Dharmapala Thangka Centre

Buddhist iconography
Mandalas